The V-STOL Pairadigm is an American twin-engine center-line thrust STOL homebuilt aircraft that was designed and produced by V-STOL Aircraft Corporation of Fort Myers, Florida, introduced in the late 1990s. When it was available the aircraft was supplied as a kit for amateur construction.

Design and development
The Pairadigm features a strut-braced high-wing, a two-seats-in-side-by-side configuration semi-enclosed cockpit with a windshield, fixed tricycle landing gear and two fuselage-mounted engines, one in tractor configuration in the nose and the other in pusher configuration in the rear fuselage.

The aircraft is made from bolted-together aluminum tubing, with its flying surfaces covered in doped aircraft fabric. The tail is a conventional low-tail design.

The manufacturer estimated the construction time from the supplied kit as 250 hours.

Operational history
By 1998 the company reported that 10 kits had been sold and one aircraft had been completed and was flying, with the design generally available from July 1998.

As of May 2015 no examples were registered in the United States with the Federal Aviation Administration.

Specifications (Pairadigm)

References

Pairadigm
1990s United States sport aircraft
1990s United States civil utility aircraft
Homebuilt aircraft
STOL aircraft
Twin-engined push-pull aircraft
High-wing aircraft